Dr. Asir Jawahar Thomas Johnsingh (born 14 October 1945) is an Indian vertebrate ecologist from Tamil Nadu. Johnsingh's study of the Dhole in Bandipur National Park was ground-breaking in that it was the first study of a free-ranging animal by an Indian scientist.

He comes from Nagercoil and is an advisor to the Ministry of Environment and Forests. He gives motivational speeches and is a wildlife enthusiast. He is also the author of various environmental books.

He was the first Indian environmentalist to study the threat caused to the Western Ghats. He is also a Padma Shri awardee and has received various other distinguished awards including the $100,000 ABN AMRO Award.

References

People from Kanyakumari district
1945 births
Living people
Indian ecologists
Scientists from Tamil Nadu
20th-century Indian biologists
People from Nagercoil